Ihor Ostash (born 4 August 1959) is a Ukrainian diplomat, who has served as Ambassador Extraordinary and Plenipotentiary of Ukraine.

Early life and education 
Ihor Ostash was born on 4 August 1959 in the village of Duliby (Lviv Oblast, Ukraine). Batiuk graduated from Lviv Ivan Franko State University (Ukraine), Slavic Department of the Philological Faculty (1982). Academy of Sciences of Ukraine, Post-graduate Studies (1985); Harvard University (United States) Post-doctorate studies (1993); Taras Shevchenko National University of Kyiv (Ukraine), Law Faculty  (1998). Ph.D. in Philology (1986). Languages: Ukrainian, English, French, Czech, Polish, Slovak, Serbian, Croatian, Russian.

Professional career 

From 1986 to 1994 – Academy of Sciences of Ukraine: Olexander Potebnya Institute of Linguistics, researcher Department of Literature, Language and Art in the Presidium of the Academy of Sciences, academic secretary International School of Ukrainian Studies, director

From 1994 to 2006 – Verkhovna Rada of Ukraine, MP Chairman of the Committee on Foreign Affairs (2000–2002); Vice President of the OSCE Parliamentary Assembly (1999–2005). Member of the Executive Committee of the Inter-Parliamentary Union (IPU) (2001–2003).

From 2006 to 2011 – Ambassador Extraordinary and Plenipotentiary of Ukraine to Canada and Permanent Representative of Ukraine to the International Civil Aviation Organization (ICAO).

Since 23 August 2016 – Ambassador Extraordinary and Plenipotentiary of Ukraine in the Lebanese Republic.

Diplomatic rank 
 Ambassador Extraordinary and Plenipotentiary of Ukraine.

References 

1959 births
People from Lviv Oblast
University of Lviv alumni
Taras Shevchenko National University of Kyiv alumni
Reforms and Order Party politicians
Front for Change (Ukraine) politicians
Second convocation members of the Verkhovna Rada
Third convocation members of the Verkhovna Rada
Fourth convocation members of the Verkhovna Rada
Ukrainian translators
20th-century translators
Ambassadors of Ukraine to Canada
Ambassadors of Ukraine to Lebanon
Living people